Gymnopilus condensus is a species of mushroom in the family Hymenogastraceae.  It was given its current name by American mycologist William Murrill in 1917.

See also

List of Gymnopilus species

References

External links
Gymnopilus condensus at Index Fungorum

condensus
Taxa named by Charles Horton Peck